Ian Cartwright (born 25 July 1954) is a former speedway rider from England.

Speedway career 
Cartwright rode in the top tier of British Speedway from 1973 to 1982, riding primarily for Halifax Dukes. He reached the final of the British Speedway Championship on two occasions in 1980 and 1981.

References 

1954 births
British speedway riders
Crewe Kings riders
Halifax Dukes riders
Living people
People from Hambleton District